HC Kharkiv was an ice hockey team based in Kharkiv, Ukraine. They participated in Division-A of the former semi-professional Ukrainian Major League. They dissolved in 2011.

External links
 Official site

2007 establishments in Ukraine
Ice hockey clubs established in 2007
Ice hockey teams in Ukraine
Sport in Kharkiv